Kowalczyk is the fifth most common surname in Poland (98,739 people in 2009).  The name comes from the word "blacksmith".

Notable people
The surname may refer to:

 Adam Kowalczyk (born 1975), American musician, brother of Ed Kowalczyk
 August Kowalczyk (1921–2012), Polish actor
 Bartosz Kowalczyk, Polish handball player
 Bogdan Kowalczyk (born 1946), Polish handball player
 Ed Kowalczyk (born 1971), American rock singer, brother of Adam Kowalczyk
 Henryk Kowalczyk (born 1956), Polish politician
 Ignace Kowalczyk (born 1913), German-French footballer
 Jacek Kowalczyk (born 1981), Polish footballer
 Jan Kowalczyk (1941–2020), Polish show jumping champion
 Jarosław Kowalczyk (born 1989), Polish cyclist
 Józef Kowalczyk (born 1938), Polish clergyman, archbishop of Gniezno
 Justyna Kowalczyk (born 1983), Polish cross-country skier
 Kamil Kowalczyk, Polish footballer
 Maciej Kowalczyk (born 1977), Polish footballer
 Marcin Kowalczyk (born 1985), Polish footballer
 Marek Kowalczyk, Polish footballer
 Mariano Kowalczyk (born 1971), Argentine rower
 Mateusz Kowalczyk (born 1987), Polish tennis player
 Sebastian Kowalczyk, Polish footballer
 Sugar Kowalczyk, 1959 American crime comedy Some Like It Hot character
 Tod Kowalczyk (born 1966), American college basketball coach
 Ulrich Kowalczyk, German football manager
 Walt Kowalczyk (1935–2018), American football player in the National Football League
 Wojciech Kowalczyk (born 1972), Polish footballer
 Kowalczyk brothers (1937-2017), Polish scientists who planted a bomb at the University of Opole in 1971

See also
 
 Mount Kowalczyk, a mountain in Antarctica
 Kowalski
 Kowal
 Kovarzik, Kovařík
 Kovács, Kovač

References

Polish-language surnames